Tsutomu Nishioka (西岡 力, Nishioka Tsutomu, born 1956 in Tokyo) is a professor of International Christian Studies at Tokyo Christian University. He specializes in Japan-Korean relations, South Korea/North Korea Studies. His research focuses on the Comfort women and the North Korean abductions of Japanese citizens. He is a chairman of the National Association for the Rescue of Japanese Kidnapped by North Korea (NARKN).

Academic career
He graduated from Tokyo Christian University in 1979 and earned a master's degree in International Area Studies from the graduate school of University of Tsukuba in 1983. He studied at the International Division in Yonsei University from 1977 to 1978. He worked at the Embassy of Japan in South Korea as a special researcher for the Ministry of Foreign Affairs from 1982 to 1984. He was an Editor in Chief of the Gendai Korea (Today's Korea) journal from 1990 to 2002.

In 2016, he started working as a guest professor for Reitaku University.

Works

Publications
 Nikkan Gokai No Shin’en (日韓誤解の深淵, The Abyss of Japan-South Korean Misunderstanding), Akishobo, (1992) 
 Koria Tabū O Toku (コリア・タブーを解く, Solving the Korea Taboo), Akishobo, (1997) 
 Yami Ni Idomu: Rachi, Kiga, Ianfu, Han-Nichi O Dō Haaku Suru Ka (闇に挑む!―拉致、飢餓、慰安婦、反日をどう把握するか, Deciphering the Darkness: Abductions, Starvation, Comfort Women and the Anti-Japan Movement), Tokuma Shoten, (1998) 
 Boso suru kokka, Kita-Chosen (暴走する国家・北朝鮮――核ミサイルは防げるのか), Tokuma Shoten, (1999) 
 Kin Sei-nichi ga shikaketa "Tainichi daiboryaku" Rachi no Shinjitu (金正日が仕掛けた「対日大謀略」拉致の真実), Tokuma Shoten, (2002) 
 KinSei-nichi to Kin Dai-chu (金正日と金大中――南北融和に騙されるな!), PHP Institute, (2000) 
 Tero kokka, Kita-Chosen ni damasareruna (テロ国家・北朝鮮に騙されるな, PHP Institute, (2002) 
 Kita-Chosen ni torikomareru Kankoku (北朝鮮に取り込まれる韓国――いま"隣国"で何が起こっているか), PHP Institute, (2004) 
 Nikkan “Rekishi Mondai” no Shinjitsu (日韓「歴史問題」の真実――「朝鮮人強制連行」「慰安婦問題」を捏造したのは誰か. The Truth About the Japan-South Korea History Issue), PHP Institute, (2005) 
 Kita-Chosen no "Kaku", "Rachi" ha kaiketsudekiru (北朝鮮の「核」「拉致」は解決できる), PHP Institute, (2006) 
 Rachi kazoku tono rokunen senso (拉致家族との6年戦争――敵は日本にもいた!), Fusosha Publishing, (2002) 
 Kankoku bunretsu (韓国分裂――親北左派vs韓米日同盟派の戦い), Fusosha Publishing, (2005) 
 Kiga to misairu (飢餓とミサイル――北朝鮮はこれからどうなるのか), Sōshisha, (1998) 
 Yoku Wakaru Ianfu Mondai (よくわかる慰安婦問題, Comfort-women Problem, You Understand Well.), Sōshisha Publishing, (2007) Yoku Wakaru Ianfu Mondai :Zōho Shimpan (文庫よくわかる慰安婦問題増補新版, Comfort-women Problem, You Understand Well., Revised Edition), Sōshisha Publishing, (2012) 
 Asahi shinbun "Nihonjin eno taizai" "Ianfu netsuzou houdou" tettei tsuikyuu (朝日新聞「日本人への大罪」 「慰安婦捏造報道」徹底追及), Goku books, (2014) 
 Yokota Megumi-san wo torimodosunoha imashikanai (横田めぐみさんたちを取り戻すのは今しかない), PHP Institute, (2015) 
 Yusuri, takari-no kokka (ゆすり、たかりの国家), Wac, (2017) 
 Rekishi wo netsuzosuru hannichi kokka - Kankoku (歴史を捏造する反日国家・韓国), Wac, (2019) 
 Dechiage no chhoyokō mondai (でっちあげの徴用工問題), Sōshisha Publishing, (2019)

Web articles

Lawsuit 
He was accused of defamation on January 9, 2015, by a former Asahi Shimbun reporter Takashi Uemura who wrote a series of articles on the comfort women issue, the first of which in 1991. Nishioka accused Uemura of "fabricating" his stories on comfort women. Takashi Uemura demanded that Bungeishunju Ltd. and Tsutomu Nishioka pay ¥27.5 million in damages and issue apologies. The Tokyo District Court in 2019 rejected his claims for damages, the ruling determined that Nishioka's claims about two articles written by Uemura “did not deviate from the scope of regular reviews.”.

Uemura appealed to the Supreme Court in Tokyo, which issued its ruling on the case on March 11, 2021, rejecting Uemura's appeal. The court concluded that: “An important part of the articles and claims [of fabrication] moved by Mr. Nishioka were based on the truth.”

References

1956 births
Comfort women
Academic staff of Tokyo Christian University
Living people
International Christian University alumni
University of Tsukuba alumni
Yonsei University alumni
Academic staff of Reitaku University